Pozo del Hato is one of the forty subbarrios of barrio Santurce in the municipality of San Juan, Puerto Rico.

Demographics
In 2000, Pozo del Hato had a population of 137.

In 2010, Pozo del Hato had a population of 218 and a population density of 3,114.3 persons per square mile.

Sites
The following building complexes are currently listed by year:
 1948 - Plaza de Diego Building, Health Center converted into Residential area

See also
 
 List of communities in Puerto Rico

References

Santurce, San Juan, Puerto Rico
Municipality of San Juan